Patricia is a 1942 French comedy film directed by Paul Mesnier and starring Gabrielle Dorziat, Louise Carletti and Georges Grey. The film's sets were designed by the art director Roland Quignon. Despite being shot on a limited budget it was one of the most popular films during the Occupation of France. It was closely aligned with Vichy policy in its portrayal of female characters from two different generations taking part in the forging of a new France.

Cast
 Gabrielle Dorziat as 	Mademoiselle Pressac - Tante Laurie
 Louise Carletti as Patricia
 Maï Bill as 	Chantal
 Georges Grey as 	Dominique
 Hubert de Malet as Jean
 Jean Servais as 	Fabien
 André Alerme as 	Le curé
 René Génin as 	Jouset
 Maurice Escande as André Vernon
 Aimé Clariond as Jacques Pressac
 Bernard Daydé as 	François

References

Bibliography
 Burch, Noël & Sellier, Geneviève. The Battle of the Sexes in French Cinema, 1930–1956. Duke University Press, 2013.

External links 
 

1942 films
French comedy films
1940s French-language films
1942 comedy films
Films directed by Paul Mesnier
1940s French films